Kato Karyes (before 1976: Καλύβια Καρυών - Kalyvia Karyon) is a village in the municipality of Megalopoli, Arcadia, Greece. It is situated near the left bank of the river Alfeios. It is 2 km southeast of Isoma Karyon, 2 km west of Thoknia and 7 km northwest of Megalopoli. Kato Karyes had a population of 61 people according to the 2011 census. There is a power plant and several open-pit lignite mines east of the village.

Population

See also
List of settlements in Arcadia

References

External links
 Karo Karyes on GTP Travel Pages

Megalopolis, Greece
Populated places in Arcadia, Peloponnese